The COVID-19 pandemic was confirmed to have reached Western Sahara in April 2020. The released data from the Moroccan government includes cases in the disputed Western Sahara territory controlled by Morocco but not Sahrawi Arab Democratic Republic, due to an ongoing dispute.

Background 
On 12 January 2020, the World Health Organization (WHO) confirmed that a novel coronavirus was the cause of a respiratory illness in a cluster of people in Wuhan City, Hubei Province, China, which was reported to the WHO on 31 December 2019.

The case fatality ratio for COVID-19 has been much lower than SARS of 2003, but the transmission has been significantly greater, with a significant total death toll.

Timeline
On 4 April, the first four cases were confirmed in Boujdour by the United Nations Mission for the Referendum in Western Sahara (MINURSO).

On 9 April, MINURSO reported that two new cases were confirmed in Dakhla, bringing the number of confirmed cases to six.

On 24 April, MINURSO reported four more cases, bringing the number of confirmed cases to ten.

By 19 June there had been 26 confirmed cases, the latest of which in Laayoune. One patient had died (in Tindouf, 24 May) while 23 had recovered and 2 were still active cases.

On 31 August there were 41 active cases in Laayoune.

On 30 April 2021, Morocco granted Carles Puigdemont asylum. According to a source from the Moroccan foreign ministry, the decision was made in due to "the principle of reciprocity to host the Catalan independence leader" after Sahrawi President Brahim Ghali was allowed to go to Spain to get treated for COVID-19.

Statistics

New cases per day

See also
 COVID-19 pandemic in Africa
 COVID-19 pandemic in the Sahrawi Arab Democratic Republic

References

Western Sahara
Western Sahara
Western Sahara
2020 in Western Sahara
2021 in Western Sahara